Nickel silver, Maillechort, German silver, Argentan, new silver, nickel brass, albata, alpacca, is a copper alloy with nickel and often zinc. The usual formulation is 60% copper, 20% nickel and 20% zinc. Nickel silver does not contain the element silver. It is named for its silvery appearance, which can make it attractive as a cheaper and more durable substitute. It is also well suited for being plated with silver.
The name "German Silver" refers to the artificial recreation of the natural ore composition by German metallurgists. All modern, commercially important, nickel silvers (such as those standardized under ASTM B122) contain significant amounts of zinc and are sometimes considered a subset of brass.

History

Nickel silver was first used in China, where it was smelted from readily available unprocessed ore. During the Qing dynasty, it was "smuggled into various parts of the East Indies", despite a government ban on the export of nickel silver. According to Berthold Laufer, it was identical to khar sini, one of the seven metals recognized by Jābir ibn Hayyān.

In Europe, consequently, it was at first called , which is about the way  is pronounced in the Cantonese dialect. The earliest European mention of  occurs in the year 1597. From then until the end of the eighteenth century there are references to it as having been exported from Canton to Europe. German artificial recreation of the natural  ore composition, however, began to appear from about 1750 onward. In 1770, the Suhl metalworks were able to produce a similar alloy. In 1823, a German competition was held to perfect the production process: the goal was to develop an alloy that possessed the closest visual similarity to silver. The brothers Henniger in Berlin and Ernst August Geitner in Schneeberg independently achieved this goal. The manufacturer Berndorf named the trademark brand Alpacca, which became widely known in northern Europe for nickel silver. In 1832, a form of German silver was also developed in Birmingham, England.

After the modern process for the production of electroplated nickel silver was patented in 1840 by George Richards Elkington and his cousin Henry Elkington in Birmingham, the development of electroplating caused nickel silver to become widely used. It formed an ideal, strong and bright substrate for the plating process. It was also used unplated in applications such as cutlery.

Uses

Nickel silver first became popular as a base metal for silver-plated cutlery and other silverware, notably the electroplated wares called EPNS (electroplated nickel silver). It is used in zippers, better-quality keys, costume jewelry, for making musical instruments (e.g., flutes, clarinets), and is preferred for the track in electric model railway layouts, as its oxide is conductive. It is widely used in the production of coins (e.g. Portuguese escudo and the former GDR marks). Its industrial and technical uses include marine fittings and plumbing fixtures for its corrosion resistance, and heating coils for its high electrical resistance.

In the nineteenth century, particularly after 1868, North American Plains Indian metalsmiths were able to easily acquire sheets of German silver. They used them to cut, stamp, and cold hammer a wide range of accessories and also horse gear. Presently, plains use German silver for pendants, pectorals, bracelets, armbands, hair plates, conchas (oval decorative plates for belts), earrings, belt buckles, necktie slides, stickpins, dush-tuhs, and tiaras. Nickel silver is the metal of choice among contemporary Kiowa and Pawnee in Oklahoma.  Many of the metal fittings on modern higher-end equine harness and tack are of nickel silver.

Early in the twentieth century, German silver was used by automobile manufacturers before the advent of steel sheet metal. For example, the famous Rolls-Royce Silver Ghost of 1907.  After about 1920, it became widely used for pocketknife bolsters, due to its machinability and corrosion resistance.  Prior to this, the most common metal was iron.

Musical instruments, including the flute, saxophone, trumpet, and French horn, can be made of nickel silver. Many professional-level French horns are entirely made of nickel silver. Some saxophone manufacturers, such as Keilwerth, offer saxophones made of nickel silver (Shadow model); these are far rarer than traditional lacquered brass saxophones. Student-level flutes and piccolos are also made of silver-plated nickel silver, although upper-level models are likely to use sterling silver. Nickel silver produces a bright and powerful sound quality; an additional benefit is that the metal is harder and more corrosion resistant than brass. Because of its hardness, it is used for most clarinet, flute, oboe and similar wind instrument keys, normally silver-plated. It is used to produce the tubes (called staples) onto which oboe reeds are tied. Many parts of brass instruments are made of nickel silver, such as tubes, braces or valve mechanism. Trombone slides of many manufacturers offer lightweight nickel silver (LT slide) option for faster slide action and weight balance. It was used in the construction of the National tricone resophonic guitar. The frets of guitar, mandolin, banjo, bass, and related string instruments are typically nickel silver. Nickel silver is sometimes used as ornamentation on the great highland bagpipe.

Nickel silver is also used in art. The Dutch sculptor Willem Lenssinck has made several pieces from German silver. Outdoor art made from this material easily withstands all kinds of weather.

Fraudulent
Counterfeiters have used nickel silver to produce coins and medallions purporting to be silver rounds, generally in an attempt to trick unsuspecting buyers into paying prices based on the spot price of silver. The metal has also been used to produce counterfeit Morgan dollars.

They are sold without notification that they contain no elemental silver.

Toxicity

According to the Merck Manual, prolonged contact of copper alloys with acidic food or beverages (including boiling milk) can leach out the copper and cause toxicity. Long-term, low doses can lead to cirrhosis.  It is also the case that many people have allergic reactions to nickel, causing a weeping rash that will not heal as long as the metal is in contact with the skin.

See also
 Argentium sterling silver – sounds similar to "argentan" but is a very different precious white metal (Argentium Sterling = 92.5% silver + 7.5% copper and germanium) which remains untarnished much longer than plain Sterling
 Britannia silver (95.833% silver, the rest usually being copper)
 Britannia metal (approx. 93% tin, 5% antimony, and 2% copper)
 Cupronickel
 Sheffield plate

References

External links

 
 Silver's Sterling Qualities

Chinese inventions
Copper alloys
Nickel alloys
Economy of the Qing dynasty
Silver